"Déconnectés" is a 2014 single by French-Moroccan DJ and record producer DJ Hamida, taken from À La Bien Mix Party 2014. It features vocals by Kayna Samet, Rim'K (of band 113) and Lartiste.

The track was the main release from the 2014 DJ Hamida album À la bien mix party 2014 reaching number 14 on SNEP official French Singles Chart totalling 14 weeks (until end of August 2014).

Charts

Weekly charts

Year-end charts

References

2014 singles
2014 songs